Dol-y-pandy is a hamlet in the  community of Melindwr, Ceredigion, Wales, which is 72.1 miles (116 km) from Cardiff and 174.9 miles (281.5 km) from London. Dol-y-pandy is represented in the Senedd by Elin Jones (Plaid Cymru) and is part of the Ceredigion constituency in the House of Commons.

References

See also
List of localities in Wales by population 

Villages in Ceredigion